Jamesport Township is a township in Daviess County, in the U.S. state of Missouri. It has a population of 1,098 (2018).

Jamesport Township was originally called Grant Township, and under the latter name was established in 1870.

References

Townships in Missouri
Townships in Daviess County, Missouri